A by-election was held for the New South Wales Legislative Assembly electorate of University of Sydney on 15 July 1879 because William Windeyer resigned to accept a temporary appointment as a judge of the Supreme Court.

While there was no qualification for candidates, Edmund Barton had graduated with a Master of Arts in 1870. and Arthur Renwick was an examiner in medicine and had been elected to the Senate of the University of Sydney in 1877. Barton was the unsuccessful candidate for the seat at the first election in 1876, while this was Renwick's first attempt at parliament. Renwick would be elected to parliament 4 months later at the East Sydney by-election.

Dates

Result

William Windeyer resigned.

See also
Electoral results for the district of University of Sydney
List of New South Wales state by-elections

References

1879 elections in Australia
New South Wales state by-elections
1870s in New South Wales